Aasakta Kalamanch (also known popularly as Aasakta)  is a Pune-based theatre troupe. Its alumni include Radhika Apte, Sagar Deshmukh, Pradeep Vaidya, Ashish Mehta, Varun Narvekar, Sarang Sathaye, and Omkar Govardhan.

History 
Aasakta Kalamanch produces plays in Marathi, Hindi, Urdu and English. It began as a non profit organisation in 2003 to produce contemporary theatre productions. In 2008, it was India's entry at Cairo International Festival of Experimental Theatre. It is headed by Mohit Takalkar. Sachin Kundalkar was the first playwright and his play Chhotyasha Suttit was appreciated by the critics. In 2017, they performed their play Gajab Kahani, at Aadyam's third season. The group recently celebrated their fifteenth anniversary by performing plays at Prithvi Theatre, Mumbai. In 2018, the group performed their play Tichi Satra Prakarne at IAPAR International Theatre Festival.

Selective performances 
 2010, NCPA's Centrestage Theatre Festival.
2013, Ranga Shankara Festival. 
 2014, National School of Drama's International Drama Festival.
 2017, Aadyam.
 2018, IAPAR International Theatre Festival.
 2019, Sarang Theatre Festival.
 2019, Bharat Rang Mahostav organised by National School of Drama, at Delhi.

Plays

Recognition 

 Best Director for Mein Huun Yusuf Aur Ye Mera Bhai at 11th Mahindra Excellence for Theatre Awards (META).

See also 
 Natak Company

References

Theatre companies in India
Organisations based in Maharashtra
Culture of Maharashtra
2003 establishments in Maharashtra
Arts organizations established in 2003